The Lemon Tree is an acoustic live album by Daryl Braithwaite recorded in June 2008 and released in October 2008 as part of the Liberation Music "Blue Acoustic" series. It peaked at number 71 in Australia in November 2008. The album includes tracks from Braithwaite's entire career. 
The album was re-released in 2012 under the title Greatest Hits Acoustic.

Review
"The Lemon Tree sparkles with the energy and immediacy of a unique and very intimate live performance."

Track listing
"As the Days Go By" - 4:05
"Rise" - 3:45
"Free The People" - 2:20
"Higher Than Hope" - 3:19
"These Days" - 4:02 
"Howzat" - 3:50
"The Horses" - 3:56
"You're My World" - 3:01
"My Man"  (vocals by Dale Kruse) - 3:21
"One Summer"
"I Haven't Met You Yet"  (vocals by David Campbell) - 3:30
"Old Sid" - 3:17
"Waters Rising" - 501

Charts

References

2008 albums
Daryl Braithwaite albums
Liberation Records albums